Laykold is a brand of tennis hardcourt constructed over an asphalt or concrete base. It can be constructed without cushion or with a cushion layer (Laykold Cushion Plus) for better force reduction and longer player longevity. Court surfaces are made of various materials including rubber, silica, and acrylic resin. Laykold is manufactured by Advanced Polymer Technology (based in Harmony, Pennsylvania).

Tournaments

Laykold has been the surface of the Miami Open since 1984. In March 2020, the United States Tennis Association (USTA) announced that US Open will be using Laykold for five years, starting with 2020 tournament.

References

External links
 

Tennis court surfaces